The Luber School is a historic one-room schoolhouse building in rural central-southern Stone County, Arkansas.  It is located at the northern corner of Luber Road (County Road 25) and County Road 214 in the community of Luber, south-southeast of Mountain View.  The school is a single story rectangular stone structure, with a hip roof that has exposed rafter ends in the Craftsman style.  A hip-roofed porch projects to the south, supported by square columns, and shelters the main double-door entrance.  The school was built by the small rural community in 1930, just before the full effects of the Great Depression and a drought ruined the area's economy.

Its schoolyard is enclosed on three sides by a low rock wall.

The building was listed on the National Register of Historic Places in 1992.

See also
National Register of Historic Places listings in Stone County, Arkansas

References

School buildings on the National Register of Historic Places in Arkansas
One-room schoolhouses in Arkansas
Buildings and structures in Stone County, Arkansas
National Register of Historic Places in Stone County, Arkansas